A French kiss is a style of kiss using the tongue.

French kiss or French kissing may also refer to:

Film and television
 French Kiss (1995 film), a 1995 movie starring Meg Ryan and Kevin Kline
 French Kiss (2011 film), a French Canadian romantic comedy
 French Kiss (2015 film), a short film
 French Kisses, 1930 comedy short with Robert Agnew
 French Kiss, a Canadian Francophone music video program on MuchMusic

Music
 French Kiss, disco/house project of producer Simon Soussan 1979
 French Kiss (band), a Japanese girl group formed in 2010
 Frenchkiss Records, a record label

Albums
 French Kiss (Bob Welch album), the debut album by Bob Welch
 French Kiss, Arielle Dombasle with The Hillbilly Moon Explosion 2015:
 French Kissin' – The Collection, an alternate title for the Deborah Harry Collection

Songs
 "French Kiss" (Lil Louis song), a 1989 house track by Lil Louis
 "French Kiss" (Kara song)
 "French Kissin'" (song), a 1986 song by Debbie Harry
 "French Kissing" (song), a 2001 song by Sarah Connor
 "French Kisses", a 2004 song by Jentina

Other
 French KiSS, an extension of the Kisekae Set System
 French Kiss (yacht), a French 12-meter yacht and the associated syndicate that competed in the 1987 America's Cup
 French Kiss: Stephen Harper's Blind Date with Quebec, a 2007 book by Chantal Hébert